Best Māori Artist is an Aotearoa Music Award that honours New Zealand music artists for outstanding recordings which reflect a unique Maori identity and/or are an expression of an artist’s Maori culture. The nominated work can be in te reo Maori, English or be bilingual. The award is presented annually at the New Zealand Music Awards where the winner receives a Tui trophy.

The award was established in 1992 as Best Maori Album, however it was soon criticised for being too broad. The category was withdrawn in 1994 and 1995, and relaunched in 1996 as two separate categories: Best Mana Maori Album and Best Mana Reo Album. From 2004, the award reverted to only the Best Maori Album category. In 2017 the award was changed to Best Maori Artist with the entry criteria changed to require either an album or a minimum of five single releases in the eligibility period.  The award was not presented in 2005, 2009 and 2010 due to insufficient entries.

In 2015, the presentation of the Best Maori Album award was not shown in the live broadcast, as the network cut to an ad break, resulting in complaints from viewers and musicians.

Recipients

Best Maori Album (1992 to 1993)

Best Mana Maori Album & Best Reo Maori Album (1996 to 2003)

Best Māori Album (2004 to 2016)

Best Māori Artist (2017 to present)

References

Aotearoa Music Awards
Awards established in 1992
1992 establishments in New Zealand